Julie Lillie is an American government official who served as the acting Deputy Secretary of the Interior from January to August 2017. She concurrently served as the director of executive secretariat and regulatory affairs.

See also
Environmental policy of the Donald Trump administration

References

External links
Director at the DOI - her profile

Year of birth missing (living people)
Living people
Trump administration personnel
United States Deputy Secretaries of the Interior